Wandilla may refer to:

HMAT Wandilla or SS Wandilla, an Australian steamship built in 1912
Wandilla (tugboat)
Wandilla, a gazetted homestead in Western Australia - see List of homesteads in Western Australia: Wa-We
Wandillah, a gazetted homestead in Western Australia - see List of homesteads in Western Australia: Wa-We